Willem Bernard "Pim" Jacobs (29 October 1934 – 3 July 1996) was a Dutch jazz pianist, composer and television presenter.

Early life
Jacobs was born on 29 October 1934 in Hilversum, the Netherlands. His parents were artistic. He started playing the piano at the age of six. His brother, Ruud, was born in 1938 and became a jazz bassist.

Later life and career
Pim and Ruud formed a trio with drummer Wessel Ilcken in 1954. The band grew with the addition of guitarist Wim Overgaauw and Ilcken's wife, Rita Reys. The trio recorded with Herbie Mann in 1956. Following Ilcken's death in 1957, Pim Jacobs and Reys performed as a duo or trio with Overgaauw, and married in 1960. They often recorded and played jazz festivals in Europe and New Orleans, "their typical program featuring arrangements of vocal music standards as well as bebop material". He also composed film music.

"Jacobs also worked as a producer of non-jazz radio and television programs from 1964, briefly operated the Go Go Club in Loosdrecht, near Hilversum, from 1967, and recorded with Herbie Mann, Bob Cooper, Louis van Dijk, and his own trio." For television, he hosted the music show Music for All. In the 1970s and 1980s he presented concerts in schools.

Jacobs died in Tienhoven on 3 July 1996. The Pim Jacobs Theatre in Maarssen was named after him. A nephew, Bobby Jacobs, became a member of the rock band Focus.

Discography

As leader/co-leader

As sideman
With Bob Cooper
Milano Blues (Fresh Sound, 1957)
With Herbie Mann
Herbie Mann with the Wessel Ilcken Trio (Epic, 1956 [1958])
With Rita Reys
Rita Reys (Philips, 1957)
Marriage in Modern Jazz (1960)
That Old Feeling (Columbia, 1979)
Swing and Sweet (Blue Note, 1990)
With Wes Montgomery

 Wes Montgomery in Holland (1965)

RefeesencesMM

1934 births
1996 deaths
Dutch jazz pianists
Dutch television presenters
People from Hilversum
20th-century Dutch pianists
Nationaal Songfestival presenters